Novosoldatka is a rural locality (a selo) in Krasnensky District, Belgorod Oblast, Russia. The population was 343 as of 2010. There are 4 streets.

Geography 
Novosoldatka is located 18 km west of Krasnoye (the district's administrative centre) by road. Novy Put is the nearest rural locality.

References 

Rural localities in Krasnensky District